The Firebirds are a British band, founded in 1981 by their former frontman John Plummer.  The band now consists of four musicians; Jim Plummer, Dan Plummer, Richie Lorriman and Paul Willmott. The band has backed artists such as Jerry Lee Lewis, Ray Campi, Charlie Gracie and Sleepy La Beefe.

In 1992, they performed at the official opening of Disneyland Paris, where they were the only British band to perform.

The Firebirds also starred in the Memorial concert at the Colston Hall in Bristol to mark 40 years of Eddie Cochran's death, in which Jim Plummer played the part of Cochran's last gig at the Bristol Hippodrome.

Over recent years The Firebirds toured Belgium, the Netherlands, France, Italy, Switzerland, Germany, Denmark and Spain, as well as a successful tour in the United States.  They were the only British band to play the 2002 Rockabilly Festival, which marked the 50th anniversary of Sun Records and 25th anniversary of Elvis Presley's death.

They have released eleven albums.

Discography

References

External links

English rock music groups
Musical groups established in 1981
Rockabilly music groups
Musical groups from Bristol